Wayside Cottage is a historic home located at Scarsdale, Westchester County, New York. The earliest part of the house was built about 1720 and is the four-bay-wide, two-bay-deep, -story south section.  It sits on a fieldstone foundation and has a gable roof and verandah with Doric order piers.  The center section of the house was built in 1828 and it is a -story, three-bay-wide structure with a gable roof and sheathed in clapboard.  A third section is known as the "caretaker's quarters" and was built in the late 19th century.  It is two stories high, three bays wide, and two bays deep.  A wing was added to this section in 1928.  The house underwent a major restoration in 1953–1954.  Since 1919, it has been owned by the Junior League of Central Westchester. It was also where Scarsdale Public Library used to be.

It was added to the National Register of Historic Places in 1981.

See also
National Register of Historic Places listings in southern Westchester County, New York

References

External links

Junior League of Central Westchester website

Houses on the National Register of Historic Places in New York (state)
Historic American Buildings Survey in New York (state)
Houses completed in 1720
Houses in Westchester County, New York
National Register of Historic Places in Westchester County, New York
1720 establishments in the Province of New York
Scarsdale, New York